This is a list of members of the Swiss National Council for the 2011–2015 term.  The National Council has 200 members, each elected to represent one of twenty-six cantons.  Elections were held on 23 October 2011, along with elections to the Council of States.  Eleven parties are represented in the National Council: the one fewer than in the previous National Council.

See also
 List of members of the Swiss Council of States

References

2011